Onoba nunezi is a species of minute sea snail, a marine gastropod mollusk or micromollusk in the family Rissoidae.The scientific name of the species was first published in 2004 by Rolán and Hernandez, after the malacologist Carlos Núñez Cortés.

Description

Distribution

References

Rissoidae
Gastropods described in 2004